Video Game High School (often abbreviated VGHS) is an action comedy web series from Rocket Jump Studios.

The first season has a movie format, broken into nine episodes, following Brian's acceptance into Video Game High School, and his first week there. He struggles to fit in and clashes with The Law, and gets expelled, but signs up for first-person shooter (FPS) tryouts, and gets accepted onto the Junior Varsity (JV) team. The second season has a television format, with story lines of every main character in each episode, and takes place over a longer time. The VGHS Varsity FPS team is disqualified from its season, and the JV team, including Jenny and Brian and coached by Jenny's mother, takes its place. Over the course of the season Jenny and Brian begin secretly dating, Jenny copes with having her mother back in her life, Brian tries to connect with his mother, Ted tries to fit in with the drifters, Ki finds her place at VGHS, and The Law picks himself up after losing so much.

Series overview

List of episodes

Season 1 (2012)

Season 1 episodes were released once a week, from May 11 to July 5, 2012. Each episode was first released on the Rocket Jump website, and a week later the same episode was re-released on the YouTube channel "freddiew." This was done in an effort to attract more visitors to the studio's official website. People who pledged $20 or more to the project's Kickstarter received HD digital downloads of each episode as they came out, as well as an HD download of the complete season. Those who pledged $25 or more received an exclusive DVD of the series with limited edition cover art, signed by cast and crew, and those who pledged $30 or more received an exclusive Blu-ray version.

Season 2 (2013)
Season 2 was confirmed during the latter half of 2012 by several of the people who worked on the first season. The Kickstarter fundraiser for season 2 started January 11, 2013, and ended on February 11, 2013, with the project more than sufficiently funded. A trailer for season 2 was released July 11, 2013, announcing the release of the first episode on July 25, 2013, but episode 1 was delayed until the following day. Inspired by The Hobbit: An Unexpected Journey, released a couple months before the production of season 2, select scenes were shot at 48 frames per second, twice the frame rate used on YouTube. The high frame rate (HFR) episodes were usually released on Rocket Jump's website at the same time as YouTube.

Season 3 (2014)
A third season was hinted at during the fundraising for season 2. Writing began during the post-production of season 2, and a third season was confirmed following the credits in the final episode of season 2. Scripts were completed in mid January 2014, the fundraiser campaign ran from January 23 to February 24, this time on Indiegogo, and filming began in March 2014. It began releasing October 13, 2014. Season 3 will be the final season.

References

External links

Video Game High School